Ashurst (New Forest) railway station is in Ashurst, Hampshire, England, on the South West Main Line from  to . It is  down the line from Waterloo.

History
Opened as Lyndhurst Road on 1 June 1847 by the Southampton and Dorchester Railway, then absorbed by the London and South Western Railway, it became part of the Southern Railway during the grouping of 1923.

The station was host to a Southern Railway camping coach from 1936 to 1939.

The station then passed on to the Southern Region of British Railways on nationalisation in 1948. A camping coach was positioned here by the Southern Region from 1954 to 1960, the coach was replaced in 1961 by a Pullman camping coach until 1965 which was joined by another Pullman for 1966 and 1967.

The station was renamed Ashurst (New Forest) on 24 September 1995. When sectorisation was introduced in the 1980s, the station was served by Network SouthEast until the privatisation of British Railways.

Services
The station is some 200 to 300 yards from the village of Ashurst, and is used by visitors to the New Forest. The services are formed of Class 444 electric multiple units, and Class 450 units. Services were previously operated by Class 442 Wessex Electrics, which were withdrawn at the start of February 2007. There is a self service ticket machine on platform 1. The station is unstaffed.

Notes

Further reading

 
 

Railway stations in Hampshire
DfT Category F2 stations
Railway stations in Great Britain opened in 1847
Former London and South Western Railway stations
Railway stations served by South Western Railway
1847 establishments in England